Alejandro González Raga is a Cuban journalist. He was jailed from 2003 until released to exile in Spain in 2008. Amnesty International recognized him as a prisoner of conscience.

González Raga signed the Madrid Charter, a document drafted by the far-right Spanish party Vox that describes left-wing groups as enemies of Ibero-America involved in a "criminal project" that are "under the umbrella of the Cuban regime".

External links
 Alejandro González Raga interviewed by Reporters Without Borders (video)

References

Amnesty International prisoners of conscience held by Cuba
Cuban dissidents
Cuban journalists
Male journalists
Living people
Year of birth missing (living people)
Cuban prisoners and detainees
Signers of the Madrid Charter